The 1907 Cincinnati Reds season was a season in American baseball. The team finished sixth in the National League with a record of 66–87, 41½ games behind the Chicago Cubs.

Regular season 
The Reds posted their second straight losing season in 1907. They won two more games than they had in 1906, when they finished 51½ games behind the Chicago Cubs. Cincinnati brought back manager Ned Hanlon for a second season, while the team made some trades during the off-season to continue with their rebuilding.

Personnel changes 
With third baseman Jim Delahanty purchased by the St. Louis Browns, the Reds' new third baseman was 23-year-old Mike Mowrey. Mowrey had seen limited playing time with the Reds in 1905 and 1906, appearing in twenty-eight games. Shortstop Tommy Corcoran, who was with Cincinnati from 1897, was purchased by the New York Giants, leaving the Reds with 25-year-old Hans Lobert to play the position. Lobert had a solid season in 1906 with the Reds, hitting .310 in 79 games. Catcher Larry McLean, who was also twenty-five, beat out Admiral Schlei for the starting catcher position, while 27-year-old rookie Mike Mitchell won a spot in the outfield. McLean spent the 1906 season with the Portland Beavers of the Pacific Coast League, where he hit .355, while Mitchell hit .339, splitting time between the Stockton Millers of the California League, and the Beavers in the PCL.

Pitching 
24-year-old pitcher Andy Coakley, who spent the previous five seasons with the Philadelphia Athletics of the American League, also joined the Reds. Coakley had gone 7–8 with a 3.14 ERA with the A's in 1906, and had his best season with Philadelphia in 1905, when he went 18–8 with a 1.84 ERA in 35 games. Another new player for the Reds was first baseman John Ganzel. Ganzel, who was thirty-three years old, had not played in the major leagues since 1904 with the New York Highlanders of the American League, where he hit .260 with six homers and 48 RBI. In 1906 with the Grand Rapids Wolverines of the Central League, Ganzel hit .323 with thirteen home runs.

Season summary 
The new look Reds saw the same results though, as for the second straight year, the team had a 10–20 record after thirty games, as Cincinnati sat in sixth place, 14.5 games behind the Cubs.  During a game on May 8, Big Jeff Pfeffer of the Boston Doves threw a no-hitter against the Reds.

The team played better ball over the next few weeks, going 18–14 in their next thirty-two games, however, they still sat in fifth place with a 28–34 record, 19 game behind the Cubs. A slump of 5–17 during the next twenty-two games saw the Reds sink to seventh place, 29.5 games behind the Cubs with a 33–51 record. Cincinnati then played just under .500 baseball for the rest of the year, going 33–36 in their last sixty-nine games, to finish the season with a 66–87 record, good for sixth place for the second straight season, as they were 41.5 games behind the pennant winning Cubs.

Mitchell had a solid rookie season, leading Cincinnati with a .292 batting average with a team high 163 hits. Mitchell also hit three homers, and drove in 47 runners. McLean batted .289 with no homers and 54 RBI, while Ganzel hit .254 with two home runs and a team best 64 RBI.

On the mound, Bob Ewing had a great year, despite posting a record of 17–19, as he led the staff with a 1.73 ERA in 41 games, starting 37 of them, while throwing 32 complete games. Coakley tied Ewing in wins, as he was 17–16, while posting a 2.34 ERA in 37 games.

Season standings

Record vs. opponents

Roster

Player stats

Batting

Starters by position 
Note: Pos = Position; G = Games played; AB = At bats; H = Hits; Avg. = Batting average; HR = Home runs; RBI = Runs batted in

Other batters 
Note: G = Games played; AB = At bats; H = Hits; Avg. = Batting average; HR = Home runs; RBI = Runs batted in

Pitching

Starting pitchers 
Note: G = Games pitched; IP = Innings pitched; W = Wins; L = Losses; ERA = Earned run average; SO = Strikeouts

Other pitchers 
Note: G = Games pitched; IP = Innings pitched; W = Wins; L = Losses; ERA = Earned run average; SO = Strikeouts

References 
1907 Cincinnati Reds season at Baseball Reference

Cincinnati Reds seasons
Cincinnati Reds season
Cincinnati Reds